The firm Glasflügel was founded by Eugen Hänle in 1962 and was located in Schlattstall, south of Kirchheim unter Teck. It was the first firm to manufacture a glass-fibre sailplane in large numbers. It was also responsible for a large number of innovations in sailplane design and technology: quick assembly systems for wings and tailplane, automatic control connections, trailing edge airbrake-flap combinations, hinged instrument panels, the parallelogram control stick and automatic trimming are some innovations introduced by Glasflügel and later adopted by other manufacturers. Some of these are standard features in nearly all gliders produced today.

Glasflügel encountered financial difficulties in the 1970s which led to a co-operation with the firm Schempp-Hirth starting from May 1975. The death of Eugen Hänle in a flight accident on September 21 of the same year further aggravated the company's position, and after further changes in ownership in 1979, it was finally dissolved in 1982.

Products
The following glider types were manufactured by Glasflügel:

Glasflügel BS-1
Glasflügel H-30 GFK
Glasflügel H-101 Salto
Glasflügel H-201 Standard-Libelle
Glasflügel H-301 Libelle
Glasflügel 202 Standard-Libelle
Glasflügel 203 Standard-Libelle
Glasflügel 204 Standard-Libelle
Glasflügel 205 Club Libelle
Glasflügel 206 Hornet
Glasflügel Hornet C
Glasflügel 303 Mosquito
Glasflügel 304
Glasflügel 401 Kestrel
Glasflügel 402
Glasflügel 604
Hansjörg Streifeneder Falcon

The projected Glasflügel 701 and 704 side-by-side two-seaters did not materialise due to the demise of the company.

Licensed production
The British company Slingsby Aviation built the Kestrel under license as the Slingsby T-59. Slingsby later developed the Slingsby Vega, a family of 15-metre span gliders heavily influenced by its previous experience with Glasflügel designs.

See also

References

Website of Hanjörg Streifeneder Glasfaser Flugzeugbau GmbH

Defunct aircraft manufacturers of Germany
Companies based in Baden-Württemberg
 
Glider manufacturers